Kamil Střihavka (born 20 January 1965) is a Czech rock singer and musical actor. In 1986, he became a member of the power metal group Motorband. In 1992, he formed BSP with Ota Balage and Michal Pavlíček. He has also released several solo projects and sung in many musicals. In 2015, he was inducted into the Beatová síň slávy.

Biography
Střihavka graduated in electrical engineering in Varnsdorf in 1983. In 1986, he started singing with the power metal group Motorband. He later switched from power metal to hard rock.
In 1992, he cofounded the trio BSP (Balage, Střihavka, Pavlíček). The group went on hiatus in 2006 and reformed in 2011. They have released two studio albums to date, BSP I (1993) and BSP II (1994).

Střihavka has performed in numerous stage musicals, including the Czech adaptation of the rock opera Jesus Christ Superstar at the former Divadlo Spirála in Prague. He performed the musical multiple times at this location between 1994 and 1998. Other musicals which Střihavka has been part of include Joan of Arc and Excalibur. He also sang the official anthem of the football club FK Teplice.

Currently, the artist leads his own band, named Kamil Střihavka & Leaders! Since November 2010, he has been performing Jesus Christ Superstar at the Musical Theatre Karlín. He is additionally a member of the musical theatre RockOpera Praha, with whom he has performed a variety of productions including Romeo and Juliet, Joan of Arc, and Robin Hood.

In 2015, he founded the Kamil Střihavka Theatre Company.

Střihavka is a contributing member of the musical project Zima.

He has released two solo albums, Woo-Doo in 2002 and 365 in 2008.

Personal life
Kamil is married and has two daughters, Eva and Tereza, with his wife Eva.

Selected discography

with Motorband
 Made in Germany (1990)

with BSP
 BSP I (1993)
 BSP II (1994)
 The Best of BSP (Live at Retro Music Hall) (2008)

Kamil Střihavka & Zdeněk Mazač
 No Guitars! (1995)
 No Guitars...? (1998)

RockOpera Praha
 Oidipus Tyranus (2011)
 7 proti Thébám (2014)

Solo
 Woo-Doo (2002)
 365 (2008)
 Kamil Střihavka 20 let na scéně - compilation of previous works (2009)

References

External links

 Official website

21st-century Czech male singers
1965 births
Living people
People from Teplice District
20th-century Czech male singers